Patrick Jerome Hillings (February 19, 1923 – July 20, 1994) was a Republican U.S. Representative from California who succeeded Richard M. Nixon in Congress. He was initially elected to California's 12th congressional district, which was renumbered as California's 25th congressional district prior to the 1952 election.

Early life and career 
Hillings was born in 1923 in Hobart Mills, California, where he attended the public schools. He attended the University of Southern California until March 1943, when he entered the United States Army Signal Corps. He was stationed in the South Pacific and served as a sergeant in the Intelligence Service until February 1946.

Returning to USC, Hillings received a Bachelor of Arts degree in 1947 and a Juris Doctor degree in 1949. He was admitted to the bar in 1949 and commenced the practice of law in Arcadia, California. He served as a delegate to the Republican National Conventions in 1952, 1956, 1960, and 1964 and supported Dwight D. Eisenhower (twice), Nixon, and Barry Goldwater, respectively.

Congress 
Hillings was elected to the Eighty-second and to the three succeeding Congresses (January 3, 1951 – January 3, 1959) from a seat vacated by Richard Nixon when he ran successfully for the U.S. Senate in 1950. After four terms in the House of Representatives, Hillings did not seek renomination in 1958, but was an unsuccessful candidate for Attorney General of California, an office vacated by Edmund G. "Pat" Brown, Sr. in his successful bid for governor. Hillings was defeated by Democrat Stanley Mosk, who would later become the longest-serving justice in the history of the California Supreme Court. Hillings cast no vote on the Civil Rights Act of 1957.

Later career 
After his unsuccessful bid for attorney general, Hillings resumed his law practice in Los Angeles. He served as chairman of the Republican Central Committee of Los Angeles County in 1960–61. In 1970, he ran in a special Republican primary to fill a vacancy caused by the death of Glenard P. Lipscomb in California's 24th congressional district, but was defeated for the nomination by John H. Rousselot, who went on to win the special general election. Hillings directed the presidential campaign of Ronald Reagan in Florida in 1979–80.

Retirement and death 
Hillings resided in Los Angeles until his death in Palm Desert, California in 1994 aged 71.

References

1923 births
1994 deaths
Burials at Arlington National Cemetery
Politicians from Los Angeles
California lawyers
United States Army personnel of World War II
Military personnel from California
University of Southern California alumni
United States Army soldiers
Republican Party members of the United States House of Representatives from California
USC Gould School of Law alumni
20th-century American politicians